The 1975 European Weightlifting Championships were held at the Luzhniki Sports Palace in Moscow, Soviet Union from September 15 to September 23, 1975. This was the 54th edition of the event. There were 123 men in action from 22 nations. This tournament was a part of 1975 World Weightlifting Championships.

Medal summary

Medal table
Ranking by Big (Total result) medals

References
Results (Chidlovski.net)
М. Л. Аптекарь. «Тяжёлая атлетика. Справочник.» — М.: «Физкультура и спорт», 1983. — 416 с. 

European Weightlifting Championships
European Weightlifting Championships
European Weightlifting Championships
International weightlifting competitions hosted by the Soviet Union
Sports competitions in Moscow